James David McFadzen (born 1 January 1999) is an English international swimmer. He has represented England at the Commonwealth Games.

Biography
McFadzen educated at Loughborough University played rugby before switching to swimming. He won the bronze medal in the 200 metres individual medley at the 2022 British Swimming Championships.

In 2022, he was selected for the 2022 Commonwealth Games in Birmingham where he competed in the men's 100 metre backstroke, finishing in 14th place.

References

1999 births
Living people
English male swimmers
British male swimmers
Swimmers at the 2022 Commonwealth Games
Commonwealth Games competitors for England
20th-century English people
21st-century English people